Bride of the Desert is a 1929 American silent Western film directed by Duke Worne and starring Alice Calhoun, LeRoy Mason and Ethan Laidlaw.

Cast
 Alice Calhoun as Joanna Benton
 LeRoy Mason as Fugitive
 Ethan Laidlaw as Tom Benton
 Lum Chan as Wang
 Walter Ackerman as Solomon Murphy
 Horace B. Carpenter as Sheriff

References

External links
 

1929 films
1929 Western (genre) films
1920s English-language films
Films directed by Duke Worne
Rayart Pictures films
Silent American Western (genre) films
1920s American films